{|

{{Infobox ship characteristics
| Hide header = 
| Header caption = 
| Ship type = Patrol and anti-submarine warfare corvette
| Ship tonnage = 
| Ship displacement = 2,400 tonnes
| Ship length = 
| Ship beam = 
| Ship height = 
| Ship draught = 
| Ship draft = 
| Ship depth = 
| Ship hold depth = 
| Ship decks = 
| Ship deck clearance = 
| Ship ramps = 
| Ship ice class = 
| Ship power = *Main:  RENK CODAG
Aux: 4 x 
| Ship propulsion = 1 gas turbine, 2 diesels, 2 shafts
| Ship speed = *Economy: 
Maximum: 
| Ship range =  at 
| Ship endurance = *21 days with logistic support
10 days autonomous
| Ship test depth = 
| Ship boats = 2 x RHIB
| Ship capacity = 
| Ship troops = 
| Ship complement = 93 including aviation officers, with accommodation up to 106
| Ship crew = 
| Ship time to activate = 
| Ship sensors = *Combat Management System: G-MSYS (GENESIS MİLGEM Savaş Yönetim Sistemi)
Search radar: SMART-S Mk2
Weapon control: STING EO Mk2
Sonar: TBT-01 Yakamoz
Communication: SatCom, GPS, LAN, ECDIS/WECDIS, Link 11/16
Navigation: ECPINS-W, ALPER LPI
IPMS: UniMACS 3000
Others: X-Band radar, Fire Control Radar
| Ship EW = *SIGINT: ARES-2N
Others: Laser/RF systems, ASW jammers, DG, SSTD
| Ship armament = *Guns:
 1 ×  Oto Melara Super Rapid (retractable for lower radar cross section, guidance by fire control radar and electro-optical systems), A position
 2 ×  Aselsan STAMP Stabilized Machine Gun Platform (guidance by Laser/IR/TV and electro-optical systems, automatic and manual modes), B position
Anti-ship missiles:
 8 × Harpoon or Atmaca
Anti-aircraft warfare:
 1 × RAM Block ITorpedoes:
 2 ×  Mk.32 twin launchers for Mk.46 torpedoes
Torpedo Defence System:
 Sea Sentor Surface Ship Torpedo Defense System
| Ship armour = 
| Ship armor = 
| Ship aircraft = *Hangar and platform for:
 S-70B Seahawk ASW helicopters
 Unmanned aerial vehicles (UAV)
| Ship aircraft facilities = Capability of storing armaments, 20 tons of JP-5 aircraft fuel, aerial refueling (HIRF) and maintenance systems
| Ship notes = 
}}
|}
The Ada class is a class of anti-submarine corvettes developed primarily for the Turkish Navy during the first stage of the MILGEM project. The Turkish Navy has commissioned all four Ada-class corvettes.

Development
The design objective of the Ada class was to build a modern littoral combat ship, with national anti-submarine warfare and high-seas patrol capabilities, while extensively using the principles of low observable technology in its design.

According to the Ada class acquisition model, Turkey's Undersecretariat for Defense Industries (SSM) signed R&D contracts for two prototype ships considered to be testing platforms. Thus, being an open-end project, first and second ships of the class were expected to be slightly different in terms of vessel design and system configuration. The subsequent vessels, scheduled to be built by private shipyards, would have a more optimized design and configuration.

The construction works of the lead ship, TCG Heybeliada commenced on 26 July 2005. TCG Heybeliada was launched with a ceremony attended by Prime Minister of Turkey Recep Tayyip Erdoğan on 27 September 2008. On 2 November 2010, Heybeliada initiated sea acceptance trials in the Sea of Marmara.First Turkish MILGEM begins sea trials, Richard Scott, IHS Jane's, 22 November 2010 Heybeliada entered navy service on 27 September 2011. Cost of the TCG Heybeliada was reported around US$260 million.

The production of the second ship of the class, commenced on 27 September 2008. Büyükada was expected to incorporate weapon systems with notable performance, such as the ASELSAN air-search radar. Büyükada was launched on 27 September 2011 and underwent sea acceptance trials before it was officially commissioned on 27 September 2013. In September 2013, then Prime Minister Recep Tayyip Erdoğan announced that the Ada-class was to be temporarily put on hold after the completion of the first two corvettes by the Istanbul Naval Shipyard, and that the bid won by RMK Marine to build six more corvettes was canceled. Motives behind this decision was reported other shipbuilders complaining about the bidding process. He added that a new bidding process would take place. Construction of  commenced on 17 December 2014. The ship was launched in June 2016 and commissioned on 4 November 2018. Turkish Naval Forces Command (TNFC) received its fourth and last Ada-class corvette, TCG Kinaliada (F-514) on 29 September 2019, in the commissioning ceremony held at the Istanbul Naval Shipyard.

On 4 November 2019, the Defense Industries Administration (SSB) of Turkey announced that Turkey's ASW corvette TCG Kinaliada successfully test-fired Atmaca anti-ship cruise missile. Turkish Navy plans to replace the inventory of Harpoon ASM by 2022.

Characteristics
The class vessels are propelled by a RENK CODAG Cross-Connect propulsion plant. Each diesel engine drives one controllable pitch propeller via a two-speed main reduction gear. The cross-connect gear splits the power from the gas turbine via both main reduction gears to the two shafts. The ship can be operated in Diesel mode, in single gas turbine mode, or in CODAG mode. CODAG is where diesel and gas turbine engines are providing combined power (27,320 kW).

The Ada-class corvettes are more heavily armed, and are equipped with more capable radar and sonar systems. The Freedom class has a higher speed and variable mission modules.

GENESIS (Gemi Entegre Savaş İdare Sistemi, i.e., Ship Integrated Combat Management System), a network-centric warfare management system developed by HAVELSAN and initially used in the upgraded s of the Turkish Navy, was contracted for the first two corvettes on 23 May 2007.Havelsan advances MILGEM integration, Jane's IDEX 2011 exhibition news, Retrieved 25 February 2011 In the last Ada-class corvette, Kınalıada, the ADVENT combat management system (an upgraded version of GENESIS) is installed instead of GENESIS system. It is also planned for Burgazada'' to be retrofited with the ADVENT combat management system. The class ships have a national hull mounted sonar developed by the Scientific and Technological Research Council of Turkey. The sonar dome has been developed by STM's subcontractor ONUK-BG Defence Systems, extensively employing nano-enhanced Fiber Reinforced Polymer. The Ada class features an Electronic Chart Precise Integrated Navigation System (ECPINS), supplied by OSI Geospatial. Integrated Platform Management System (IPMS) for controlling machinery, auxiliary systems, power generation and distribution was delivered by STM's subcontractor Yaltes JV. Main systems integrated to IPMS are power management system, fire detection system, fire fighting, damage control system, CCTV system and stability control system.

Naming
"Ada" means island in Turkish. Each individual ship of the class is named for a Turkish island, in particular the Prince Islands in the Sea of Marmara to the southeast of Istanbul. The lead ship of the class, is named after Heybeliada island, where the Turkish Naval High School is located.

Ships in the class
Turkey - Turkish Navy 

Pakistan - Pakistan Navy

Ukraine - Ukrainian Navy

Export
On 6 April 2011, Indonesia and Turkey signed a defense industry cooperation agreement, including the construction of two Ada-class corvettes for the Indonesian Navy.

The Ukrainian Ministry of Defense has ordered 2 corvettes with construction to be performed jointly by the Turkish STM and Ukrainian shipyard. Under the deal, the first vessel will be delivered to Ukraine by the end of 2023 unfinished, to then be completed in Ukraine. The deal was signed in December 2020 worth $256 million.

In DSA 2022, STM has proposed their 99M OPV based on Ada-class to Royal Malaysian Navy for their Littoral Mission Ship batch II program.

See also

References

Corvette classes